The 1912 Georgia Bulldogs football team represented the Georgia Bulldogs of the University of Georgia during the 1912 Southern Intercollegiate Athletic Association football season. The Bulldogs completed the season with a 6–1–1, but its 46–0 loss to Vanderbilt was a big disappointment.   Vanderbilt completed its 1912 season undefeated and won its third straight SIAA conference title.  The otherwise strong season also include a tie with Sewanee.  Bob McWhorter continued to overpower Georgia's opponents.

Schedule

References

Georgia
Georgia Bulldogs football seasons
Georgia Bulldogs football